Hangzhou Hikvision Digital Technology Co., Ltd., often shortened to Hikvision, is a Chinese state-owned manufacturer and supplier of video surveillance equipment for civilian and military purposes, headquartered in Hangzhou, Zhejiang. Due to its involvement in mass surveillance of Uyghurs, the Xinjiang internment camps, and national security concerns, the company has been placed under sanctions from the U.S. and European governments.

History
Hikvision was founded in 2001 by Zhejiang HIK Information Technology Co., Ltd. with the company having a 51% stake and Gong Hongjia a 49% stake at that time.

Hikvision has been listed on the Shenzhen Stock Exchange since 2010.

In October 2016, the company concluded a deal to use Movidius' computer vision technology. 

In May 2017, Hikvision established Hikstorage, a subsidiary focused on the production of storage devices.

In January 2021, the company won a US$33 million, 1,900-camera smart city project in Shanghe County, Shandong that includes cameras with facial recognition and license plate recognition technologies.

In 2021, Best Buy, Home Depot, and Lowe's stopped selling cameras from Hikvision brand Ezviz due to concerns about Hikvision's complicity in surveillance and human rights violations in Xinjiang.

In 2022, Hikvision was awarded a Chinese government contract to develop software to track "key people" in order to prevent them from entering Beijing. The same year, IPVM also reported that Hikvision has specific alarms in its software to alert Chinese police to "religion, Falun Gong, and various protest activities. Amazon Web Services provides cloud services to Hikvision.

Sanctions and bans 

In January 2019, the U.S. government began considering whether it should sanction Hikvision, which American government officials described as having "provided thousands of cameras that monitor mosques, schools, and concentration camps in Xinjiang."

The U.S. government banned Hikvision from receiving federal government contracts in August 2019 due to security concerns. In October 2019, Hikvision was formally placed on the Entity List by the U.S. government, which stated that it was involved in surveillance of Uyghurs in Xinjiang and of other ethnic and religious minorities in China. Hikvision expressed its opposition to the U.S. decision and stated that they believe the decision had no factual basis. They urged the U.S. government to re-examine its decision.

In response to the bans and sanctions, Hikvision has hired former U.S. ambassador Pierre-Richard Prosper "to advise the company regarding human rights compliance" as well as numerous lobbyists, including former U.S. senators David Vitter and Barbara Boxer, former U.S. congressman Toby Moffett, and a former senior OFAC official.

In August 2020, the Indian government banned Hikvision from bidding in government tenders and also required removal of Hikvison cameras from military and high-security areas.

In April 2021, the European Parliament confirmed that it had removed Hikvision thermal cameras from its premises following the approval of an amendment sponsored by Dutch MEP Lara Wolters calling for the removal of "all of Hikvision’s thermal cameras from Parliament’s premises" due to "an unacceptable risk that Hikvision, through its operations in Xinjiang, is contributing to serious human rights abuses."

In July 2021, the UK Foreign Affairs Select Committee published a report stating that Hikvision cameras "have been deployed throughout Xinjiang, and provide the primary camera technology used in the internment camps".

In June 2022, documents from the Xinjiang Police Files showed how Hikvision technology is used by Xinjiang police to surveil all Xinjiang residents.

In June 2021, 224 Hikvision products were banned for one year by South Korea's Ministry of Science and ICT over forged test reports.

In September 2021, the Indian Navy's headquarters "asked its all formations to 'discontinue' procurement of CCTV cameras and surveillance systems from Hikvision," according to The Week. The Week also reported that the Indian Navy had ordered the replacement and destruction of its existing Hikvision cameras.

In April 2022, the UK Department of Health and Social Care banned the purchase of Hikvision cameras. In November 2022, the UK prohibited the use of Hikvision equipment in government buildings.

In February 2023, Australia's Department of Defence announced that it will remove cameras made by Hikvision from its buildings.

United States 

In November 2020, U.S. President Donald Trump issued an executive order prohibiting any American company or individual from owning shares in companies that the United States Department of Defense has listed as having links to the People's Liberation Army, which included Hikvision. In December 2020, Hikvision was removed from FTSE Russell.

On 12 January 2021, the Joe Biden inaugural committee returned a $500 donation to former U.S. Senator Barbara Boxer (D-CA) after she registered as a foreign agent for Hikvision.

In March 2021, the Federal Communications Commission (FCC) declared that Hikvision services and equipment "pose an unacceptable risk to U.S. national security." In November 2022, the FCC banned sales or import of equipment made by Hikvision for national security reasons.

Ownership

 Hikvision was owned by China Electronics Technology HIK Group Co., Ltd. (HIK Group), a wholly owned subsidiary of China Electronics Technology Group, which has a 39.59% stake. China Electronics Technology Group is a state-run enterprise owned and supervised by the State-owned Assets Supervision and Administration Commission of the State Council. China Electronics Technology Group holds an additional 1.96% stake of Hikvision via its 52nd research institute. The Chairman of Hikvision, Chen Zongnian, is also the chairman and the Party Committee Secretary of HIK Group, and Head of the aforementioned research institute.

 the firm's largest individual shareholder was vice-chairman Gong Hongjia with a 13% stake. As of 12 2019 Fidelity International was also a major investor in Hikvision.

In 2017, the third largest shareholder was a private equity fund which had a 7% stake, which is associated with then Hikvision general manager Hu Yangzhong. According to previous filing, "Xinjian Weixun" was also associated with Liu Xiang, former director (from 2015 to March 2018) and former deputy general manager of Hikvision, then deputy general manager of HIK Group, chairman of sister listed company Phenix Optical.

In 2017, the fourth largest shareholder was another private equity fund which had a 2% stake. The fund was partly owned by Gong's wife Chen Chunmei and aforementioned Hu Yangzhong. Hu Yangzhong also owned an additional 1.33% stake personally. To sum up, those shareholders owned a combined 65.71% stake. Lastly, Hong Kong Securities Clearing Company owned 9.77%, which was the nominees of the Shanghai-Hong Kong Stock Connect and Shenzhen-Hong Kong Stock Connect.

In 2021, IPVM alleged that Hikvision was created and controlled by the Chinese government.

Alleged attempts to conceal government ownership
In 2015, IPVM criticized Hikvision for allegedly obscuring its Chinese government ownership. Jeffrey He, president of Hikvision North America, had criticized the online blogger site for allegedly seeking financial gain.

Alan West, in a 2016 interview published by The Times (and re-published by The Australian), suggested that Hikvision's ownership raised ethical and security concerns when it came to the usage of Hikvision's products by the British government.

Cybersecurity vulnerabilities
In May 2017, seven series of Hikvision cameras were affected by an improper authentication vulnerability which, if exploited, could allow "a malicious attacker [to] escalat[e] his or her privileges or assum[e] the identity of an authenticated user and [obtain] sensitive data," according to the U.S. Cybersecurity and Infrastructure Security Agency.

In May 2021, Italian public broadcaster RAI reported that Hikvision cameras automatically "opened communication channels with addresses registered in China" once connected to the internet. Hikvision declined to comment on the RAI investigation.

In September 2021, Hikvision announced a command injection vulnerability with the CVE-ID CVE-2021-36260. Forbes reported that the vulnerability, which has a CVSS base score of 9.8 out of 10, left dozens of Hikvision camera models "susceptible to remote hijacking" without requiring a username or password.

In 2022, Axios reported that Hikvision had hired FTI Consulting to conduct cybersecurity audits of its products.

Notes

References 

Technology companies of China
Companies listed on the Shenzhen Stock Exchange
Companies in the CSI 100 Index
Electronics companies of China
Video surveillance companies
Action cameras
Camcorders
Manufacturing companies based in Hangzhou
Technology companies established in 2001
Chinese brands
Government-owned companies of China
Defence companies of the People's Republic of China